"Everybody Needs Love" is a 1964 Motown song by Norman Whitfield and Edward Holland, Jr. The first version released was by The Temptations for their album The Temptin' Temptations in 1965 (it also got airplay on some radio stations in the U.S.), but the most successful version was on a single by Gladys Knight & the Pips, which peaked at #39 on the Billboard Hot 100 chart, and #3 on the Billboard R&B singles chart, in 1967. Other Motown acts that recorded this song were Mary Wells (who was the first to record it, though it was not released until after she left the company), which featured Eddie Kendricks of The Temptations in the background, Jimmy Ruffin,  The Velvelettes, and The Miracles. All versions of the song were produced by Whitfield.

Personnel

Mary Wells version 
 Lead vocals by Mary Wells
 Background vocals by The Love Tones: Joe Miles, William "Mickey" Stevenson, and Stan Bracely, with Eddie Kendricks of The Temptations
 Instrumentation by The Funk Brothers

Jimmy Ruffin version 
 Lead vocals by Jimmy Ruffin
 Background vocals by The Andantes: Jackie Hicks, Marlene Barrow, and Louvain Demps
 Instrumentation by The Funk Brothers

Temptations version 
 Lead vocals by Eddie Kendricks and Melvin Franklin
 Background vocals by Eddie Kendricks, Melvin Franklin, Paul Williams, David Ruffin, and Otis Williams
 Instrumentation by The Funk Brothers

Gladys Knight & the Pips version 
 Lead Vocals by Gladys Knight
 Background Vocals by Merald "Bubba" Knight, Edward Patten and William Guest
 Instrumentation by The Funk Brothers

The Miracles version
 Lead Vocals by William "Smokey" Robinson
 Background Vocals by Claudette Robinson, Pete Moore, Ronnie White, and Bobby Rogers
 Guitar by Marv Tarplin `
 Other instrumentation by The Funk Brothers

The Velvelettes version
 Lead Vocals by Carolyn Gill
 Background Vocals by The Andantes: Louvain Demps, Marlene Barrow, and Jackie Hicks
Instrumentation by The Funk Brothers

References 

1964 songs
1967 singles
The Temptations songs
Gladys Knight & the Pips songs
Jimmy Ruffin songs
Mary Wells songs
The Miracles songs
Songs written by Eddie Holland
Gordy Records singles
Songs written by Norman Whitfield
Song recordings produced by Norman Whitfield